Jan Jakub Kotík (22 October 1972 in Buffalo, New York, United States – 13 December 2007 in Prague, Czech Republic) was a Czech artist and rock drummer.

Life 
Jan Jakub was the son of composer Petr Kotík and curator of contemporary art Charlotta Kotík, who emigrated to the United States in 1970. His paternal grandfather was the artist Jan Kotik and his maternal great-grandfather was Tomáš Garrigue Masaryk, first president of Czechoslovakia. Jakub was a musician and visual artist. He played drums with the Mommyheads, Beekeeper, and Church of Betty, among many other bands in New York City. He attended Fiorello H. LaGuardia High School of Music & Art and Performing Arts in New York City and received a Bachelor of Arts degree from The Cooper Union.

In 2000, he moved to Prague, where he became a highly acclaimed visual artist. In 2007 he received the prestigious Jindřich Chalupecký Award. On 13 December 2007 he died after a three-year battle with cancer.

References

External links 

Jan Jakub Kotík (1972 – 2007)
Autor Jan Jakub Kotík
hunt kastner artworks artists Jan Jakub Kotík
Artist Jan Jakub Kotík ARTLIST – database of contemporary Czech art

1972 births
2007 deaths
Czech artists
American people of Czech descent
Bootstrappers (band) members
American punk rock drummers
American male drummers
Musicians from Buffalo, New York
Cooper Union alumni
Deaths from cancer in the Czech Republic
21st-century American artists
Fiorello H. LaGuardia High School alumni
20th-century American drummers
21st-century American drummers
20th-century American male musicians